The Dover Demon is a creature reportedly sighted in the town of Dover, Massachusetts on April 21 and April 22, 1977.

Sightings
17-year-old William "Bill" Bartlett claimed that while driving on April 21, 1977, he saw a large-eyed creature "with tendril-like fingers" and glowing eyes on top of a broken stone wall on Farm Street in Dover, Massachusetts. 15-year-old John Baxter reported seeing a similar creature on Miller Hill Road the same evening. Another 15-year-old, Abby Brabham, claimed to have seen the creature the following night on Springdale Avenue.

The teenagers all drew sketches of the alleged creature. Bartlett wrote on his sketch, "I, Bill Bartlett, swear on a stack of Bibles that I saw this creature." According to the Boston Globe, "the locations of the sightings, plotted on a map, lay in a straight line over 2 miles".

Some suggested that the creature may have been a foal, newborn elk or a moose calf. Police told the Associated Press that creatures reported by the teenagers "were probably nothing more than a school vacation hoax."

In popular culture
In 2009, The Dover Demon was featured in an episode of the American horror television series Lost Tapes, which aired on Animal Planet.

The Dover Demon appears as a character in the American comic book series Proof, which features various other creatures. In the comic, it is a creature able to see into the future. It appears in another similar comic book series called The Perhapanauts. The Dover Demon would further make brief appearances in the comic books The Pound: Ghouls Night Out, and Hack/Slash: Entry Wound.

A Dover Demon also appears in the webcomic Gunnerkrigg Court.

See also
Mannegishi

References

1977 in Massachusetts
Alleged UFO-related entities
American legendary creatures
Dover, Massachusetts
History of Norfolk County, Massachusetts
Massachusetts folklore
Supernatural legends